Ashanti Shequoiya Douglas (born October 13, 1980) is an American singer and actress. She was first discovered as a teenager and later signed to Murder Inc. Records in 2002. That year, she was featured on Fat Joe's "What's Luv?" and Ja Rule's "Always on Time", both of which became two of the biggest hit songs of 2002. She became the first female artist to occupy the top two positions on the U.S. Billboard Hot 100 chart simultaneously with "Foolish" and "What's Luv?" at numbers one and two, respectively.

In 2002, Ashanti released her eponymous debut album, which sold over 505,000 copies throughout the U.S. in its first week of release. The album earned her many awards, including eight Billboard Music Awards, two American Music Awards, and a Grammy Award in 2003 for Best Contemporary R&B Album. The album has since been certified triple platinum in the United States and sold six million copies worldwide by the end of 2003. The lead single for the album, "Foolish", was a critical and commercial success; it reached number one on the Billboard Hot 100. With "Foolish", she became the second artist (after The Beatles) to have their first three chart entries in the top ten of the Billboard Hot 100 simultaneously. Ashanti wrote and provided background vocals for Jennifer Lopez's "Ain't It Funny (Murder Remix)", which also reached number one on the Billboard Hot 100.

In 2003, Ashanti released her second album, Chapter II, which debuted at number one on the Billboard 200, with first-week sales of 326,000 copies in the U.S. The album went platinum, selling over 1.5  a million copies in the U.S. since its release. The album's singles, "Rock wit U (Awww Baby)" and "Rain on Me", were both commercial successes, peaking at number two and number seven on the Billboard Hot 100 chart, respectively. Chapter II was nominated for a Grammy Award for Best Contemporary R&B Album, and "Rock wit U (Awww Baby)" and "Rain on Me" were each nominated in the categories of Best R&B Song and Best Female R&B Vocal Performance. In November 2003, Ashanti released a Christmas album titled Ashanti's Christmas, which was a modest commercial success.

In 2004, Ashanti released her third studio album, Concrete Rose, the title of which took on Tupac Shakur's pseudonym "The Rose That Grew from Concrete". The album debuted at number seven in the U.S., with first-week sales of 254,000 copies, and became her third platinum-certified album. The first single, "Only U", reached number thirteen on the Billboard Hot 100 and became her biggest hit in the United Kingdom, peaking at number two. A second single, the ballad "Don't Let Them", garnered little chart success after Def Jam refused to fund a music video due to Irv Gotti's legal troubles during his money laundering trial. Her subsequent albums include The Declaration (2008) and Braveheart (2014), the latter of which was released independently, on Ashanti's record label, Written Entertainment.

Aside from music, Ashanti has also acted in various productions. In 2005, she made her feature film debut in Coach Carter alongside Samuel L. Jackson. She also starred as Dorothy Gale in the made-for-television film The Muppets' Wizard of Oz, which attracted nearly 8 million viewers when it premiered. She has since appeared in the films John Tucker Must Die (2006) and Resident Evil: Extinction (2007). Throughout her career, Ashanti has sold nearly 15 million records worldwide.

Early life 
Ashanti Douglas was born on October 13, 1980 in Glen Cove, New York. Her mother, Tina Douglas, is African-American and a former dance teacher, her father, Ken-Kaide Thomas Douglas, is also African-American and a former singer. She is the oldest of her parents' children, with a younger sister named Kenashia "Shia" Douglas. Ashanti's mother named her after the Ashanti Empire in Ghana; in this nation, women had power and influence, and Tina wanted Ashanti to follow that model. Her grandfather, James, was a civil rights activist who was associated with Martin Luther King Jr. in the 1960s.

Ashanti's mother discovered her full singing potential when she overheard Ashanti singing Mary J. Blige's "Reminisce" at age 12 (after the song was released on Ashanti's birthday). While attending high school, she began to write songs. As a teenager, she performed in a local talent show and at several small festivals. She got her first taste of acting as a child extra in Spike Lee's Malcolm X (1992) and in Ted Demme's Who's the Man?. She also had a couple of minor appearances in music videos, such as KRS-One's "MC's Act Like They Don't Know" as well as 8-Off's "Ghetto Girl".

Ashanti struggled to find success as a singer after being courted by several record labels, including Bad Boy and Jive. Despite this, she continued to perform in and around New York and began hanging out at the Murder Inc. recording studio, hoping for a big break.

Career

2001–2003: Ashanti, Chapter II and Ashanti's Christmas 
Ashanti was first noticed by Irv Gotti because of her vocal skills. He asked her to pen hooks for his rap artists and to perform with them in duets. Ashanti provided the melodic response to their call. Ashanti was first featured as a background vocalist on rapper Big Pun's song "How We Roll". In the same year, Ashanti was featured on fellow labelmate Cadillac Tah's singles "Pov City Anthem" and "Just Like a Thug". She also appeared on the 2001 The Fast and the Furious soundtrack as a featured artist on Vita's 2001 hip hop remake of Madonna's "Justify My Love" and on the solo track "When a Man Does Wrong". She was then featured on Fat Joe's "What's Luv?" and Ja Rule's "Always on Time". "What's Luv?" and "Always on Time" were released simultaneously and became two of the biggest hit songs of 2002. Ashanti became the first female to occupy the top two positions on the U.S. Billboard Hot 100 chart simultaneously when "Always on Time" and "What's Luv?" were at numbers one and two, respectively.

Following the success of her collaborations with Ja Rule and Fat Joe, Ashanti released her debut single, "Foolish", which contains a sample of the 1983 song "Stay with Me" by DeBarge (also used by The Notorious B.I.G. in his 1995 single "One More Chance", and by Big L in "MVP"). This is her biggest success to date, spending ten weeks atop the Billboard Hot 100. She became the second artist (after The Beatles) to have their first three chart entries in the top ten of the Hot 100 simultaneously. Ashanti's self-titled debut album, Ashanti, was released on Irv Gotti's Murder Inc. record label in April 2002. It debuted at number one on the U.S. Billboard 200 albums chart. The album has been certified triple platinum in the United States and sold six million copies worldwide. Ashanti wrote the album's twelve tracks, most of which were written on the spot in the studio. Ashanti's follow-up singles, "Happy" and "Baby", were not as successful as her debut single but peaked inside the top ten and top twenty in the U.S., respectively. Ashanti's debut album earned her many awards, including eight Billboard Music Awards, two American Music Awards, and a Grammy Award in 2003 for Best Contemporary R&B Album. Ashanti was the first artist to win Best Contemporary R&B Album before the category was last awarded in 2011. She was nominated as Best New Artist and "Foolish" was nominated in the Best Female R&B Vocal Performance category. She also received a Comet Award and two Soul Train Music Awards that same year.

Ashanti became the subject of controversy when it was announced that she would receive the Soul Train Aretha Franklin Award for "Entertainer of the Year", a high school student took offense and started an online petition against her, explaining to The Seattle Times that she was too new to deserve the award. Nearly 30,000 people agreed with him, signing the petition. Many said that established artists such as Mary J. Blige and Missy "Misdemeanor" Elliott or critically acclaimed singers like Alicia Keys and India.Arie were more deserving of an award that carries the name of a musical legend. Despite the petition, the Soul Train committee and Don Cornelius stuck by their decision. Ashanti was applauded by her musical peers as she entered the Pasadena Civic Auditorium to accept her award and she was supported onstage by Patti LaBelle, who stated "she's a baby and we have to support our babies."

Just before the release of her second album, Ashanti headlined VH1 Divas Duets alongside Whitney Houston, Chaka Khan, Beyoncé and Lisa Marie Presley. During the concert, she performed duets with the Isley Brothers and Stevie Wonder, and participated in the all-star finale performance of Wonder's "Higher Ground."

In July 2003, Ashanti released her second album, Chapter II, which debuted at number one on the Billboard 200, with first-week sales of 326,000 copies in the U.S. The album went platinum, selling over 1.5  a million copies in the U.S. Chapter IIs first single, "Rock wit U (Awww Baby)", became a hit, peaking at number two on the Billboard Hot 100. Its video, which showed Ashanti in a bikini frolicking on a beach and riding an elephant, was nominated for two 2003 MTV Video Music Awards. A remix of the song contains interpolations of Michael Jackson's "Rock with You". The second single, "Rain on Me", reached the number seven spot on the Hot 100 and number two on the Hot 100 R&B Songs chart. Chapter II was nominated for a 2004 Grammy Award for Best Contemporary R&B Album, and "Rock wit U (Awww Baby)" and "Rain on Me" were nominated in the categories of Best R&B Song and Best Female R&B Vocal Performance, respectively. In the "Rain on Me," mini-movie music video—directed by Hype Williams and co-starring Larenz Tate—Ashanti portrays a troubled young woman in an abusive relationship. She received a Lifetime Channel Achievement Award for her message speaking out against domestic violence. That same year, she began dating rapper Nelly.

In November 2003, Ashanti released a Christmas album titled Ashanti's Christmas. It contained 10 Christmas songs and was a modest commercial success and sold just around 100,000 units in the U.S. The album peaked at No. 160 in the Billboard charts.

 2004–2007: Concrete Rose, Collectibles by Ashanti and acting 

Before Concrete Rose was released, Ashanti did some major promotion for her single "Only U", when she premiered it at the 2004 Vibe Music Awards. She featured on "Wonderful"—with Ja Rule and R. Kelly—that year, which peaked at number five in the U.S. and at number one in the UK. In December 2004, Ashanti released her third studio album, Concrete Rose, the title of which took on Tupac Shakur's pseudonym "The Rose That Grew from Concrete". The album debuted at number seven in the U.S., with first-week sales of 254,000 copies, and eventually became her third platinum-certified album. The first single, "Only U", reached number thirteen on the Billboard Hot 100 and became her biggest hit in the United Kingdom, peaking at number two. A second single, the ballad "Don't Let Them", garnered little chart success after Def Jam refused to fund a music video due to Irv Gotti's legal troubles during his money laundering trial. The single was released only in the U.S., where it failed to chart, and the UK, where it reached the lower end of the top forty. After the release of Concrete Rose, Ashanti released the DVD Ashanti: The Making of a Star, which was available only for a limited time. The deluxe DVD includes an exclusive photo and video shoot footage, music from the albums Ashanti, Chapter II and Concrete Rose, special concert footage, unreleased childhood school performances, and behind-the-scenes interviews with family, friends, and fans.

In 2005, Ashanti focused more on her acting career, making her feature film acting debut in the film Coach Carter alongside Samuel L. Jackson, as well as starring as Dorothy Gale in the made-for-television film The Muppets' Wizard of Oz, which pulled in nearly 8 million viewers when it premiered. She sang "When I'm with You" for the film which was nominated for a Primetime Emmy in the Outstanding Music and Lyrics category. In Coach Carter, she played a pregnant teenager named Kyra who has to decide whether or not to abort her unborn child. The movie opened at number-one at the U.S. box office, eventually grossing $67  million domestically. Later in 2005, Ashanti was invited to Oprah Winfrey's Legends Ball, which honored some of the most influential and legendary African American women of the twentieth century in the fields of art, entertainment, and civil rights. In December 2005, Ashanti released a remix album of Concrete Rose titled Collectables by Ashanti. The album was an opportunity for her to fulfill her contract with Def Jam (and have the option of working with another label). It did not fare well on the charts.

In 2006, she starred in the teen comedy John Tucker Must Die, which opened and peaked at number three at the U.S. box office (competing with Pirates of the Caribbean: Dead Man's Chest and Miami Vice) and grossed $68,818,076 worldwide. In 2007, she played a supporting role in the action film Resident Evil: Extinction (2007).

 2008–2010: The Declaration, departure from The Inc. and The Wiz 

Her fourth studio album, The Declaration, was released on June 3, 2008,  and sold 86,000 units its first week of release, which were the lowest first-week sales for any of Ashanti's studio albums. In mid-2007, MTV News reported that the first single from The Declaration was "Switch", which was produced by Shy Carter and released digitally in the United States on July 24, 2007. It was later reported that "Switch" may not be included on the album's track listing, and that the first single would be "Hey Baby (After the Club)" it was released to radio and digital outlets on October 16. The song, which does not appear on the U.S. editions of the album, peaked at number eighty-seven on the Billboard Hot R&B/Hip-Hop Songs chart. "The Way That I Love You", was released to radio and digital outlets in January 2008, and was referred to as the "first single" in press material and media reports. It reached number two on the Hot R&B/Hip-Hop Songs chart and number thirty-seven on the Billboard Hot 100, becoming Ashanti's first song to reach the top forty since "Only U" in 2004. "Body On Me" was recorded not only for Ashanti's The Declaration, but also for Nelly's fifth studio album Brass Knuckles. The track is produced by Akon and Giorgio Tuinfort. It went to number one on Billboard's Hot Videoclip Tracks chart in its first week, becoming the first number-one single from Nelly's album."Good Good" was released to urban radio stations on July 16, 2008. The song contains elements of Elton John's 1974 single "Bennie and the Jets", and has the same melody arrangement as Michael Jackson's "The Girl Is Mine". In July 2008, Ashanti was named an ambassador of tourism for Nassau County, Long Island.

In May 2009, Irv Gotti announced that he was officially releasing Ashanti from The Inc. Records, stating that "The relationship has run its course. The chemistry of what's needed — we're in two totally different places. You're talking to somebody that took her and shaped and molded her and put her out there for the world, and it blew up. We [hold the record] for the [fastest] selling debut by a female R&B artist — 503 [thousand]. We did it! My views and philosophies and her views and philosophies are not meeting up." Gotti also admitted that he and Ashanti have not spoken to each other in a long time. A representative for Ashanti did not respond. On September 24, 2009, Ashanti announced her fifth studio album would be released from her new label, Written Entertainment.

Ashanti headlined the cast of The Wiz in the New York City Center Encores! Summer Stars staging from June 12 to July 5, 2009. Ashanti's role as Dorothy has since received mixed reviews from critics as most praised her vocals but was less pleased with her acting ability. BET and Entertainment Weekly both praised the singer's performance as The New York Post and New York Times gave lukewarm reviews. Though the first night was sold out, some of the other shows were unable to follow its success. On October 27, 2008, Ashanti took part in The Yellow Brick Road Not Taken, a one night only concert to celebrate the fifth anniversary of Wicked, featuring songs written by Stephen Schwartz, that were cut from the show.

 2011–2014: Hiatus and Braveheart 

After a four-year hiatus, Ashanti released the song "Never Too Far Away", which was featured in Morgan Creek's film Dream House starring Daniel Craig, Rachel Weisz with Naomi Watts. The lead single from her fifth studio album, "The Woman You Love" featuring American rapper Busta Rhymes, was released online on December 15, 2011. Ashanti teamed up with Meek Mill and French Montana for the second single "No One Greater", which was produced by 7 Aurelius, Irv Gotti and Chink Santana. In April 2013, she released another single called "Never Should Have", which later won "Best Independent R&B/Soul Performance" at the 2013 Soul Train Awards. A music video for the track was also released.

In November 2012, it was reported that she had landed her first series regular role in the seventh season of Army Wives, playing Latasha Montclair. The series was canceled on September 24, 2013. In the fall of 2013, she appeared in a guest spot on Law & Order: Special Victims Unit alongside Clay Aiken and Taylor Hicks. She also starred in the Lifetime film Christmas in the City which premiered on December 7, 2013.

In August 2013, Ashanti announced her plans to once again work with Ja Rule, who'd been released from prison in July of that year following a six-year sentence stemming from a gun charge. On January 8, 2014, she revealed the official cover art and release date for Braveheart, her fifth album, which was released on March 4, 2014. In January 2014, Ashanti shot the video for the official first single from Braveheart titled "I Got It" featuring Rick Ross. The video was shot in Miami, Florida, and was directed by Eif Rivera. In July, Ashanti announced that the second official single from BraveHeart would be "Early in the Morning" featuring French Montana. Upon release, the album garnered favorable reviews, with music critics describing Braveheart's sound as an "evolution of R&B" and praising the themes of empowerment but criticizing the romantic clichés and lack of interesting moments on the album. On the charts, Braveheart opened at number ten in the U.S. Billboard 200, becoming Ashanti's fifth consecutive top-ten album, as well as her first Independent Albums chart-topper. It also debuted in the top thirty of the UK R&B Albums Chart and top-forty of the UK Indie Albums Chart.

 2015–present: Current activities and upcoming seventh studio album 

In 2015, she announced that she had worked on new music for her seventh album, with an unknown release date. Ashanti collaborated with Michelle Obama for her #Let'sMove campaign to spread awareness of drinking water with her new video and song "Let's Go" released in 2015. In 2016, she collaborated on the song "Seven Day Love" included in the album "Inzombia" by Canadian singer Belly. She has also worked with numerous artists, including Sia, Alicia Keys, John Legend, Queen Latifah, Usher and Kelly Clarkson to interpret the songs of the Broadway musical "Hamilton" for the compilation "The Hamilton Mixtape".

In 2017, Ashanti announced her seventh studio album, revealing it would be released in 2018. She denied this in June 2018, confirming the future release of an album in collaboration with rapper Ja Rule. Between 2017 and 2018 she returned to the music scene with several collaborations including the single "Say Less" with Ty Dolla Sign, the track "The Road" by Machel Montano, and the song "Start This Shit Off Right" with Mack Maine, from the album "Tha Carter V" by Lil Wayne.

Ashanti released the collaboration "Pretty Little Thing" with Afro B in August 2019.Archived at Ghostarchive and the Wayback Machine:  She also featured on the soundtrack of the film Stuck, which she produced. In November, Ashanti guest-starred as herself in two episodes of the third season of The CW's Dynasty reboot: "Mother, I'm At La Mirage" and "Something Desperate".

In January 2021, Ashanti released her single "2:35 (I Want You)".

On March 10, 2022, Ashanti's single "Rock wit U (Awww Baby)" was heavily sampled for British rapper Aitch's single "Baby".

In October 2022, Ashanti was featured on Diddy’s “Gotta Move On” remix which also features Bryson Tiller and Yung Miami.

 Artistry 
Ashanti has a lyric soprano voice type. Critics have referred to her voice as "pretty" and her soprano as "sultry" and "sweet but slight". Jason Birchmeier of AllMusic noted her reputation for using her "swooning voice" in duets with Big Pun, Fat Joe, and Ja Rule. As a young girl, Ashanti was influenced by Ella Fitzgerald, Whitney Houston, Michael Jackson, Prince, and Tupac Shakur, but she cites Mary J. Blige as the main reason she wanted to pursue a singing career. Further musical influences include Janet Jackson, Mariah Carey, Madonna, Smokey Robinson, Donna Summer, and Blue Magic.

 Philanthropy 
In 2003, Ashanti partnered with LidRock and the San Francisco-based Family Violence Prevention Fund (FVPF) to raise awareness about the issue of domestic violence during National Domestic Violence Awareness Month and to distribute the "Rain on Me" mini-movie using LidRock's unique platform. Proceeds from the $5 mini-disc went towards helping to stop domestic violence. Ashanti also recorded a public service announcement that appeared in more than 4,000 film screens and reached millions of people. Ashanti also gives back by raising money for sickle cell research and she is active in helping the Make-A-Wish Foundation stating, "I'll go and do just about anything for them." In 2005, Ashanti helped by recording public service announcement and raising money for the Southeast Asia tsunami disaster. Later that year, she helped raise money for the Hurricane Katrina victims and storm evacuees.

In 2008, Ashanti, along with others celebrities, taped a PSA to help stop violence and discrimination towards the LGBT community in response to the death of Lawrence King, an eighth-grader at E.O. Green Junior High School, who was shot because of his sexual orientation and gender expression. That same year, she launched a special on-line campaign called "I Declare Me..." with Wal-Mart. The campaign's core is a very personal focus on the self-definition and empowerment of women across the United States, with its home base at Ashanti's official website. The campaign creates a safe and inclusive on-line space to for women to share testimonies on the site. Participants are able to openly declare their own breakthroughs, revelations, struggles and victories in every life area they choose: career, birth, death, relationships, and personal situations. "I Declare Me..." also invites women to a virtual discussion with Ashanti on such issues as voter registration, teen obesity, and other concerns facing women today.

In September 2009, Ashanti, along with other artists such as Mariah Carey, Beyoncé, Mary J. Blige, Rihanna, Fergie, Sheryl Crow, Miley Cyrus, Melissa Etheridge, Natasha Bedingfield, Keyshia Cole, Ciara, Leona Lewis, LeAnn Rimes and Carrie Underwood, teamed up for the song "Just Stand Up!". The charity tune for cancer was conceived by Antonio "L.A." Reid, who produced it with longtime creative colleague Babyface. All 15 singers (along with Nicole Scherzinger) shared the stage to perform the song live on September 5, 2008, during the "Stand Up to Cancer" television special, which aired simultaneously on ABC, NBC and CBS, and helped raise $100 million for cancer research. As a result of SU2C fund raising endeavors, the SU2C scientific advisory committee, overseen by the American Association for Cancer Research, was able to award 73.6 million dollars towards novel, groundbreaking cancer research in 2009.

In November 2009, Ashanti joined the crew of ABC's Extreme Makeover: Home Edition. In the episode, which aired on January 24, 2010, the singer assisted in the rebuilding of the Powell Family home in Buffalo, New York.  The efforts from the show expanded significantly to include not just the family home but the entire neighborhood surrounding it. In 2013, Ashanti featured on the 19-track compilation album Songs for a Healthier America, a collaborative project by the Partnership for a Healthier America, whose honorary chair is Michelle Obama, and Hip Hop Public Health. Her song "Just Believe" also featured Artie Green, Gerry Gunn, Robbie Nova and Chauncey Hawkins. Additionally, she is affiliated with the Jumpstart reading program, the Tupperware Brand and the Boys and Girls Club of America.

 Personal life 
On January 1, 2003, Ashanti met rapper Nelly at a press conference for the 2003 Grammy Awards, and the two later began dating. They ended their relationship after a decade together.

 Discography 

Studio albums
 Ashanti (2002)
 Chapter II (2003)
 Ashanti's Christmas (2003)
 Concrete Rose (2004)
 The Declaration (2008)
 Braveheart (2014)

Filmography

Film

Television

Theater

 See also 
 List of awards and nominations received by Ashanti

 References Other sources'

External links 

 
 
 
 
 

 
1980 births
Living people
21st-century American actresses
21st-century American singers
21st-century American women singers
Actresses from New York (state)
African-American actresses
African-American female dancers
African-American female models
African-American record producers
African-American women singers
African-American women singer-songwriters
American contemporary R&B singers
American dance musicians
American dancers
American female dancers
American female models
American film actresses
American hip hop record producers
American hip hop singers
American people of Chinese descent
American people of Dominican Republic descent
American philanthropists
American sopranos
American soul singers
American television actresses
American women hip hop musicians
American women hip hop singers
American women record producers
American women singer-songwriters
Dancers from New York (state)
Def Jam Recordings artists
Epic Records artists
Female models from New York (state)
Glen Cove High School alumni
Grammy Award winners
Murder Inc. Records artists
People from Glen Cove, New York
People from Old Westbury, New York
People from Roslyn, New York
Record producers from New York (state)
Singer-songwriters from New York (state)
Universal Motown Records artists